Kristjan Raud Art Award is an Estonian art award which is established in 1973, being the oldest art award in Estonia. The award is given out annually by Estonian Artists' Association and Tallinn City Government. The award can be given to artists, art historians, creative collectives, art projects or an art events.

Recipients

 1973 Ilmar Kimm, Enn Põldroos, Riho Kuld, Salme Raunam
 ...
 2020 Anu Hint, Juta Keevallik, Jaan Toomik, Anne Türn

References

External links
 

Estonian awards
Estonian art
Visual arts awards